IronFX is a Cyprus-based broker providing access for speculators to the retail foreign exchange market. The company has offices in Cyprus, London, Johannesburg. The company holds licenses from the Financial Conduct Authority (FCA) in the United Kingdom, the Cyprus Securities and Exchange Commission (CySEC) in Cyprus and the Financial Services Board (FSB) in South Africa.

History
IronFX was founded in Limassol, Cyprus in December 2010 after obtaining authorization by the CySEC.

In 2013, IronFX opened an office in Australia and became regulated by the ASIC, while it also received authorization of the FCA in the UK. In early 2014, IronFX opened an office in London and was soon granted with the variation of permission license and extended the scope of the existing license in order to upgrade the services provided to the traders under the FCA authorization.

In 2014, IronFX opened an office in South Africa and became authorized and regulated by the Financial Services Board (South Africa).

According to the Wall Street Journal, IronFX, filed confidentially for an IPO in 2015, in the New York Stock Exchange (NYSE) in 2015, aiming for a valuation of $800 million.

In August 2015, the CySEC announced an investigation related to IronFX. In November 2015, the CySEC settled all charges against the firm, agreeing to a €335,000 settlement with the company while imposing fines on FXGM, EZTrader, Interactive Option, UFX and others ranging from €123,000 up to €340,000.

IronFX officially informed leading industry directories that they have voluntarily left 4 regulations in June 2015, these regulations included CRFIN of Russia, BaFin of Germany, CONSOB of Italy and FSP of New Zealand.  In the very same announcement, the company also showed that they have closed offices in a number of countries including China, Nigeria and Russia.

In June 2018 Cyprus regulator CySEC Fined IronFX €2,000 Over Financials Submission Failure.

On 30th of August 2021, IronFX in Australia renounced to its license and IronFX will no longer operate in Australia under the umbrella of ASIC (Australian Security and Investments Commission).

References

Further reading
 Interview with Markos Kashiouris
 IronFX explores impact of risk aversion on currency markets

Financial services companies of Cyprus
Financial services companies established in 2010
Financial derivative trading companies
Foreign exchange companies
Companies based in Limassol
2010 establishments in Cyprus